Nate Craft (born March 28, 1977 in Royal Oak, Michigan) is a U.S. soccer defender with the Michigan Bucks in the USL Premier Development League

Craft spent several years playing recreational soccer while working as a factory manager.  In 2003, he joined the Michigan Bucks of the Premier Development League.  His excellent play brought him to the attention of the Rochester Rhinos of the USL First Division.  He signed with the Rhinos in the spring of 2006 and has remained with the team since then.  In the fall of 2006, he joined the Detroit Ignition of the Major Indoor Soccer League.  He was named to the 2006-2007 All Rookie Team, helping lead the Ignition to the MISL Championship match where they fell to the Philadelphia KiXX.

In 2009, Craft again returned to play for the Michigan Bucks.

References

External links
Detroit Ignition Player Profile
Rochester Rhinos Player Profile

1977 births
Living people
American soccer players
USL First Division players
USL League Two players
Rochester New York FC players
Flint City Bucks players
Detroit Ignition (MISL) players
Expatriate soccer players in Canada
Soccer players from Michigan
Xtreme Soccer League players
Association football defenders